School Master is a 1958 Indian Kannada language film, produced and directed by B. R. Panthulu. The film starred B.R. Panthulu himself in the lead role along with Dikki Madhava Rao, M. V. Rajamma, Udaykumar, Sivaji Ganesan, Gemini Ganesan and B. Saroja Devi in important roles. It was the first Kannada film to complete a Silver Jubilee Celebration. This film had its children's dance drama in Gevacolor, taken by cinematographer W. R. Subba Rao. It was later remade in  Telugu, Tamil, Malayalam and Hindi in spite of it being dubbed in Tamil and Telugu as Engal Kudumbam Perisu and Badi Pantulu, respectively.

In 1959, ALS Productions remade it in Hindi as School Master which was also directed by Panthulu. The film was remade in Malayalam in 1964 as School Master by Puttanna Kanagal, in Telugu in 1972 as Badi Panthulu and in Tamil in 1973 as School Master.

It was the first Kannada movie to be remade in four languages and also the first Kannada movie to be remade in three other South Indian languages. The movie is based on 1937 English movie Make Way for Tomorrow  which has been adapted multiple times including in Japanese as Tokyo Story (1953), in Marathi as Oon Paus (1954), in Tamil as Varavu Nalla Uravu (1990), in Pakistani as Samaj (1972) and twice in Hindi as Zindagi (1976) and Baghban (2003).

Plot 

The story revolves mostly around the producer/director B. R. Panthulu who plays the role of school master, and his wife. Uncommonly for Balkrishna, he plays a positive role in the film. Bustling actor Narasimharaju is also present.

A humble school teacher with his two sons and a daughter arrives at a new place. He finds that the school building is in bad shape and his staff are not motivated to teach. He is a strict disciplinarian, which is shown in a humorous way.

His elder son gets into fight with a ruffian student, Vaasu. Vaasu is punished, but his innate goodness wins over his teacher. He is given special care, to become a good student.

The teacher has to fight against village politics, when he wishes to build a new building to the school. Undeterred, he motivates his students and villages to amass enough funds to build it.

However, henchmen in the village burn down his house. His pet student Vaasu gathers all his friends and builds a small house for his teacher.

Years pass and Vaasu tops his matriculation exams.

The teacher's sons get married, much against the wishes of their parents, but the teacher takes it in his stride. Their beautiful daughter is married to a simpleton business man.

When the teacher retires, his sons are averse to take their parents. With no savings of his own, the teacher has to rely on his sons to lead a retired life. The elder son takes his father, while the younger one takes his mother. The teacher is thus separated from his wife.

Things take such a bad turn, that teacher cannot even read his wife's letter, because his sons will not provide him with spectacles.

In the climax, the teacher's erstwhile house, which was painfully constructed by his students, has to be auctioned off. Vaasu (Sivaji Ganeshan), now the Superintendent of Police, happens to pass by in the car and notices the auction. Distraught with pain, he confides to his wife, this is the very house, he built with his fellow students for the teacher, who led him to the garden path. He is overcome by emotions, on seeing the auction. Vaasu's wife immediately removes all her jewellery and urges Vaasu to use them to stop the auction and pay the bank. Vaasu is filled with joy and does so.

The teacher is filled with happiness on seeing his once ruffian student becoming a role model. His journey of being a teacher has met a satisfactory end.

Soundtrack 
The film's score was composed by T. G. Lingappa.

Kannada version 
School Master
Playback singers are A. M. Rajah, T. G. Lingappa, Pithapuram Nageswara Rao, Soolamangalam Rajalakshmi, P. Susheela, A. P. Komala, K. Rani and K. Jamuna Rani.

Tamil version 
The Tamil version is titled Engal Kudumbam Perisu. Lyrics were by K. D. Santhanam, Ku. Sa. Krishnamoorthy and Ku. Ma. Balasubramaniam. Playback singers were T. M. Soundararajan, A. M. Rajah, T. G. Lingappa, S. C. Krishnan, Soolamangalam Rajalakshmi, P. Suseela, A. P. Komala, K. Rani and K. Jamuna Rani.

Telugu version 
The Telugu version is titled Badi Pantulu.  Playback singers were P. B. Sreenivas, A. M. Rajah, T. G. Lingappa, Pithapuram Nageswara Rao, Soolamangalam Rajalakshmi, P. Susheela, A. P. Komala, K. Rani and K. Jamuna Rani.

Awards 
National Film Awards
 1959 – All India Certificate of Merit for Third Best Feature film
 1959 – National Film Award for Best Feature Film in Kannada

References

External links 
 

1950s Kannada-language films
1958 films
Best Kannada Feature Film National Film Award winners
Films directed by B. R. Panthulu
Films scored by T. G. Lingappa
Kannada films remade in other languages
Third Best Feature Film National Film Award winners